Wu Ah-min (born 10 June 1938) is a Taiwanese athlete. He competed in the decathlon at the 1964 Summer Olympics and the 1968 Summer Olympics.

References

1938 births
Living people
Athletes (track and field) at the 1964 Summer Olympics
Athletes (track and field) at the 1968 Summer Olympics
Taiwanese male pole vaulters
Taiwanese decathletes
Olympic athletes of Taiwan
Place of birth missing (living people)
Asian Games gold medalists for Chinese Taipei
Asian Games medalists in athletics (track and field)
Athletes (track and field) at the 1966 Asian Games
Medalists at the 1966 Asian Games
20th-century Taiwanese people